Zénon Bacq (31 December 1903 in La Louvière – 12 July 1983 in Fontenoy) was a Belgian radiobiologist and inventor. He studied medicine at the Université Libre de Bruxelles (ULB), and became an MD in 1927. He studied at Harvard University (1929–1930), with a grant from the FNRS. He taught animal physiology, pathology, as well as pharmacology and radiobiology at the University of Liège (ULg).

While studying the chemical transmissions of nerve impulses, he invented processes to guard himself against ionizing radiations. In 1948 he was awarded the Francqui Prize on Biological and Medical Sciences.

Honours 
 3.7.1971: Member of the Royal Academy of Science, Letters and Fine Arts of Belgium.

References

External links
 Zenon Bacq (in French)

1903 births
1983 deaths
People from La Louvière
Belgian physicians
Members of the Royal Academy of Belgium
Walloon people
Harvard University alumni
Free University of Brussels (1834–1969) alumni
Academic staff of the University of Liège
Walloon movement activists